Built in 1915, the Old Tarpon Springs City Hall is a historic site in Tarpon Springs, Florida. It is located at 101 South Pinellas Avenue. On August 10, 1990, it was added to the U.S. National Register of Historic Places. It was designed by renowned architect Ernest Ivey Cook in the neoclassical style.

Tarpon Springs Cultural Center
The Tarpon Springs Cultural Center, located in the Old Tarpon Springs City Hall, features changing exhibits of art and sculpture.

References

 Pinellas County listings at National Register of Historic Places
 Florida's Office of Cultural and Historical Programs
 Pinellas County listings
 Old Tarpon Springs City Hall

External links
Tarpon Springs Cultural Center - official site

City and town halls in Florida
National Register of Historic Places in Pinellas County, Florida
Art museums and galleries in Florida
Buildings and structures in Tarpon Springs, Florida
Clock towers in Florida
Tourist attractions in Pinellas County, Florida
City and town halls on the National Register of Historic Places in Florida
1915 establishments in Florida
Government buildings completed in 1915